Mathias David Grönberg (born 12 March 1970) is a Swedish professional golfer who has played on the European Tour, PGA Tour, and their second-tier tours.

Amateur career
Grönberg was born in Stockholm, Sweden. He won the Swedish Boys Championship in 1988 and the British Youths Open Amateur Championship in 1990. That year he helped Sweden to win the Eisenhower Trophy, and picked up the individual title at that event.

Professional career
Grönberg turned professional late in 1990. After starting out on the second tier Challenge Tour, he was a member of the European Tour from 1994 to 2003, winning four European Tour events in that time. His best finish on the European Tour Order of Merit was tenth in 1998. However, he was keen to join the PGA Tour in America, repeatedly entering its Qualifying Tournament. After six failed attempts he topped the event in 2003. He had difficulty settling on the PGA Tour, and after his 2005 second season he had to return to the Qualifying Tournament to retain his card, which he did. His best finish in a tour event so far is a tie for 3rd place at the 2007 Valero Texas Open, where he ultimately trailed winner Justin Leonard by three shots.

Grönberg won his first title on the Nationwide Tour in 2009 at the Melwood Prince George's County Open where he lapped the field and won by six strokes over Esteban Toledo and Justin Bolli. He finished 24th on the money list to earn his 2010 PGA Tour card.

Personal life
Grönberg's wife, Tara, is American. They have a son Van, born in 2002, a daughter Ava, born in 2005 and a son Axl, born in 2009. They reside in West Palm Beach, Florida.

Mathias Grönberg Trophy 2008 
In August 2008 the first Mathias Grönberg Trophy event took place in Sweden. Grönberg's goal is to make golf more popular with young children. It’s a yearly event that is being played at Kårsta Golf Club.

Amateur wins
1988 Swedish Boys Championship
1990 British Youths Open Amateur Championship
1991 Swedish Open

Professional wins (6)

European Tour wins (4)

1Co-sanctioned by the Sunshine Tour

European Tour playoff record (0–1)

Sunshine Tour wins (1)

1Co-sanctioned by the European Tour

Nationwide Tour wins (1)

Nationwide Tour playoff record (0–1)

Challenge Tour wins (1)

Results in major championships

Note: Grönberg never played in the Masters Tournament.

CUT = missed the half-way cut
"T" = tied

Results in The Players Championship

CUT = missed the halfway cut
"T" indicates a tie for a place

Results in World Golf Championships

1Cancelled due to 9/11

QF, R16, R32, R64 = Round in which player lost in match play
"T" = Tied
NT = No tournament

Team appearances
Amateur
European Amateur Team Championship (representing Sweden): 1989
Eisenhower Trophy (representing Sweden): 1990 (winning team and individual leader)

Professional
Alfred Dunhill Cup (representing Sweden): 1998, 2000
World Cup (representing Sweden): 1998, 2000
Seve Trophy (representing Continental Europe): 2002

See also
2003 PGA Tour Qualifying School graduates
2005 PGA Tour Qualifying School graduates
2008 PGA Tour Qualifying School graduates
2009 Nationwide Tour graduates

References

External links

Profile at golfdata.se

Swedish male golfers
European Tour golfers
PGA Tour golfers
Korn Ferry Tour graduates
Swedish expatriates in Monaco
Golfers from Stockholm
Sportspeople from West Palm Beach, Florida
People from Monte Carlo
1970 births
Living people